CGP-35348 is a compound used in scientific research which acts as an antagonist at GABAB receptors.

CGP-35348 was ineffective up to 100 μM to antagonize the inhibitory release of GABA elicited by baclofen, doing it selective as GABAB heteroreceptor antagonist.
 Moreover, CGP-35348 was about threefold less potent to antagonize gamma-hydroxybutyrate (GHB) and gamma-butyrolactone (GBL) than baclofen and SKF-97,541.

References

GABAB receptor antagonists
Phosphinic acids